Eagles Mere Air Museum is an aviation museum located on Merritt Field on the outskirts of Eagles Mere, Pennsylvania in North Central Pennsylvania. The museum has 35 vintage aircraft from 1913 to 1944, as well as hundreds of other aviation related items pertaining to that era, including photos, engines and aircraft components.

Overview 
The museum is located in three buildings, "Alpha hangar" is the largest which has 12 aircraft on display, the museum's admissions and gift shop is also located here. "Bravo hangar" holds five more aircraft and features videos of the museum and airport construction and early years. "Charlie hangar" has another four aircraft. "Delta hangar" also has four aircraft on display and "Echo hangar" holds three aircraft.

Collection 
As of mid-2019 the museums collection includes:

 Aeronca C-3
 Aeronca L-3
 Alexander Eaglerock
 Boeing-Stearman Model 75
 Brunner-Winkle Bird
 Cessna Model A
 Curtiss Robin
 Curtiss Fledgling
 Curtiss-Wright Junior
 De Havilland Tiger Moth
 Pitcairn PA-3 Orowing
 Pitcairn PA-4 Fleetwing II
 Piper J-3 Cub
 Swanson Coupe
 Taylor J-2
 Travel Air 2000
 Travel Air 5000
 Kinner Sportwing
 Waco 10
 Waco Standard

See also 
 List of aerospace museums
 Aviation in Pennsylvania

References

External links 
 Official website

Aerospace museums in Pennsylvania